Tobacco 21 was a United States national campaign aimed at raising the minimum legal age to purchase tobacco and nicotine in the United States to 21. The campaign ended when Congress passed and President Donald Trump signed the 2020 United States federal budget which raised the federal smoking age to 21.

The campaign was produced and funded by the Preventing Tobacco Addiction Foundation, a public health nonprofit organization established in 1996. Several national non-profit organizations, including the American Cancer Society in Oregon, had supported raising the tobacco age.

Rationale 
Studies show that around 95% of adult smokers tried cigarettes before turning 21, and 80% of them had their first cigarette before their 18th birthday. Adult smokers may supply tobacco products to younger consumers. Tobacco 21 law supporters believe that teenagers have fewer acquaintances aged 21 who could purchase nicotine delivery products for them.

The chosen age limit also has a precedent in the alcohol industry. The U.S.-wide legal age of 21 for the purchase of alcohol products is credited for reduced consumption among young people, as well as decreased alcohol addiction and drunk driving cases, but this claim is widely disputed and further research suggests raising the age had no effect on underage access and drunk driving rates.

Scientific aspect 
The major scientific publication in support of Tobacco 21 is the Institute of Medicine's report "Public Health Implications of Raising the Minimum Age of Legal Access to Tobacco Products", which concluded by saying: "if the MLA were raised now to 21 nationwide, there would be approximately 223,000 fewer premature deaths, 50,000 fewer deaths from lung cancer, and 4.2 million fewer years of life lost for those born between 2000 and 2019."

An editorial in the New England Journal of Medicine called Tobacco 21 "An idea whose time has come".

On the contrary, there is evidence that suggests an age limit of 21 is not necessarily useful. Multiple studies, including review in 2011, provided evidence against the idea that raising the drinking age to 21 has actually saved lives in the long run. In one study, Miron and Tetelbaum (2009) discovered that when the federally coerced and non-coerced states were separated out, any lifesaving effect is no longer statistically or practically significant in the coerced states, and even in the voluntary-adopting states the effect does not seem to last beyond perhaps the first year or two.  They also found that the 21 drinking age appears to have only a minor impact on teen drinking. This could have many implications for the long-term effectiveness of the smoking age of 21.

Endorsements
The following organizations have endorsed Tobacco 21 at the national level, either through their own statements or through endorsement of Senate Bill 2100, the federal bill to raise the tobacco age to 21:
 Campaign for Tobacco Free Kids
 American Heart Association
 American Lung Association
 American Medical Association
 Institute of Medicine
 American Academy of Family Physicians
 American Academy of Pediatrics
 Society for Adolescent Health and Medicine
 Counter Tobacco
 Action on Smoking and Health
 Tobacco Control Legal Consortium
 Clearway Minnesota / Minnesotans For A Smoke Free Generation
 Oral Health America
 American Cancer Society Cancer Action Network
 Academic Pediatric Association
 American Pediatric Society
 American Veterans (AMVETS)
 American Public Health Association
 American Congress of Obstetricians and Gynecologists
 Trust for America’s Health
 Association of Medical School Pediatric Department Chairs
 First Focus Campaign for Children
 Pediatric Policy Council
 Society for Pediatric Research
 Association of Asian Pacific Community Health Organizations
 Asian Pacific Partners for Empowerment, Advocacy, and Leadership (APPEAL)
 Hawai‘i Medical Service Association
 Coalition for a Tobacco-Free Hawai‘i

United States

State and national movement

Hawaii
Hawaii’s Tobacco 21 bill was signed by Governor David Ige and raised the legal age to purchase tobacco products, including electronic smoking devices, to 21, beginning on January 1, 2016.

The legislation of this bill arose after the Institute of Medicine released a report explaining that raising the age to 21 would have significant public health benefits. The report estimated that making the minimum age 21 would result in avoiding nearly 250,000 premature deaths and 50,000 fewer deaths from lung cancer among individuals born between 2000-2019.

Under the bill, anyone caught breaking the law faces a $10 fine for the first offense and a $50 fine or community service for a second offense. Retailers caught selling to individuals under the age of 21 pay penalties ranging from $500-$2,000.

A press release on the governor’s website explained the decision by referencing that in the United States, 95 percent of adults smokers begin smoking before the age of 21. Almost half of those become regular smokers before the age of 18 and another 25% become regular smokers between the ages of 18-21.

California
California became the second state to implement a statewide Tobacco 21 law. Governor Jerry Brown signed a group of bills on May 4, 2016. The bills were described as the “most expansive” attempt to regulate tobacco use within the state of California in over a decade. The bills were supported by various organizations and medical groups including the American Heart Association, American Cancer Society, American Lung Association, and California Medical Association. The bill was approved in a special health care session and became effective on June 9, 2016.

Washington, D.C.
On October 1, 2018, Washington, D.C., raised the legal age of buying tobacco to 21. This was paired with raising the tax on cigarettes by 68% – to $4.94.

National minimum age increase
On December 20, 2019, as a part of the Further Consolidated Appropriations Act, 2020, the Federal Food, Drug, and Cosmetic Act was amended, raising the federal minimum age for sale of tobacco products in the US from 18 to 21. This legislation (known as “Tobacco 21” or “T21”) was effective immediately, and it is now illegal for a retailer to sell any tobacco product—including cigarettes, cigars, and e-cigarettes—to anyone under 21 across the United States. The new federal minimum age of sale applies to all retail establishments and persons with no exceptions. Some commentators have condemned the act for its questionable legality, considering it unconstitutional in violating a state's right to choose its own laws regarding setting an age for certain legal capacities, such as the ability to purchase tobacco.

Local movements

Needham
In 2005, Needham, Massachusetts became the first jurisdiction worldwide to pass and enact a Tobacco 21 policy.

New York City
In November 2013, New York City enacted legislation that raised the age to purchase tobacco products to 21, and also set a minimum price of $10.50 per pack of cigarettes, among other provisions. The law went into effect on May 18, 2014.
The bill came with significant penalties for those who do not comply with the law. Failure to post required signage can result in fines of up to $500. Sales of cigarettes, other tobacco products or electronic cigarettes to people under age 21 can result in New York City fines of up to $1,000 for the first violation and any other violation found that same day, and up to $2,000 for the second violation and any subsequent violation within three years. A second violation may result in revocation of the cigarette retail dealer license. New York State may impose additional fines and penalties for sales of these products to people under age 18.

Boston
In December 2015, Boston followed New York City by passing an ordinance to raise the tobacco sales age to 21. Boston's Tobacco 21 law went into effect on February 15, 2016.

Chicago
In March 2016, Chicago passed its Tobacco 21 ordinance. The law went into effect on July 1, 2016.

Kansas City
Kansas City approved its Tobacco 21 bill on November 19, 2015 and quickly put it into effect a week later on November 26.

Cleveland
In December 2015, Cleveland passed a local ordinance to ban the sale of tobacco and nicotine products to any persons under the age of 21. The law went into effect on April 14, 2016.

San Francisco
In March 2016, San Francisco joined the ranks of major American cities to pass an ordinance to raise the tobacco and nicotine sales age to 21. The ordinance went into effect on June 1, 2016. Eight days later, California's Tobacco 21 bill went into effect statewide.

International movements

Australia 
In Australia, the Minderoo Foundation runs Tobacco21.com.au and advocates for the smoking age in Australia to be raised to 21. The Australian state of Tasmania has considered raising its smoking age from 18 to 21 but has faced some opposition from the Tasmanian Liberal government.

Canada 
A similar organization, named Tobacco21.ca, has advocated increasing the smoking age in Canada to 21. On March 1, 2020, Prince Edward Island became the first Canadian province to raise its smoking age from 19 to 21.

United Kingdom 
Sajid Javid, the former UK Secretary of State for Health and Social Care, advocated for raising smoking age in the United Kingdom to 21. It has been heavily criticized by some commentators.

Criticism 

Some have called into question the usefulness of raising the smoking age to 21, pointing to studies showing the ineffectiveness of raising the drinking age to 21 in the long-term for the United States, as it only had a minor effect on teen drinking. Some suggest that the age restriction laws are merely a way to placate critics of "Big Tobacco", in that setting a higher age limit would appease people looking for bigger solutions.

References

External links
 Tobacco 21 website
 Tobacco21.ca website

Tobacco control
American health websites
Smoking in the United States
Public service announcement organizations
Health policy
American health activists
Health campaigns
Minimum ages